A wide game is a kind of game played in a large area, such as a field, heathland or woodland, or a defined urban area. It is commonly played by Scouts, Girl Guides and other groups of young people. Common games include capture the flag and team variants of tag, or variants of field games like football, rugby, and ultimate Frisbee.

Some youth clubs such as the Woodcraft Folk have elaborated the role-playing and costume elements of wide-games.

Wide game techniques and approaches are being re-worked for modern cities and modern technology, in games such as Day of the Figurines, in which mobile phone communication is heavily used between players.

References

External links
Training Scouts for wide games
Wide Games
Blast Theory's modern city-wide version of a wide game

Outdoor games
Scouting